The Ain Tsila gas field is a natural gas field located in the Illizi Province. It was discovered in 2012 and developed by Petroceltic International. Production is expected to begin in 2020-21 and will produce natural gas and condensates. The total proven reserves of the Ain Tsila gas field are around 10.1 trillion cubic feet (289×109m³), although there is no acquired well test data to support this figure. Production is slated to be around 350 million cubic feet/day (10×105m³).

References

Natural gas fields in Algeria